The 1957 Wightman Cup was the 29th edition of the annual women's team tennis competition between the United States and Great Britain. It was held in Edgeworth, Pennsylvania in the United States.

References

1957
1957 in tennis
1957 in American tennis
1957 in British sport
1957 in women's tennis